Sheffield Scimitars were a semi-professional English ice hockey team, formed originally in 1986 as an Under 21 side. They initially played at the small 500 capacity Sheffield Ice Sports Centre, more commonly known as Queens Road, and became a senior side in the 1990s, playing in the ENIHL.  The team moved to the iceSheffield complex upon it opening in 2002, where they became successful in the ENIHL and made the step-up to the EPL in 2005–06. Their mascot was a male hockey player with a large smiling head named "Scimi", shirt number 00.
In July 2010, the team ceased operations, and was replaced by the Sheffield Steeldogs, who took over the Scimitars' spot in the EPL.

Honours

2002–2003
ENHL Northern League Champions
ENHL Northern Cup Winners

2003–2004
ENHL National Champions
ENHL National Cup Winners
ENHL Northern League Play-off Champions
ENHL Northern Cup Winners

2004–2005
ENHL National Champions
ENHL National Cup Winners
ENHL Northern League Play-off Champions
ENHL Northern League Champions
ENHL Northern Cup Winners

2005–2006
Yorkshire Cup Winners

External links
Official website

Ice hockey teams in England
Ice hockey clubs established in 2002
Scimitars
2002 establishments in England